Coming Around Again is the 13th studio album by American singer-songwriter Carly Simon, released by Arista Records, on April 13, 1987. 

The first of many albums Simon recorded for Arista; the title track was written for and featured in the 1986 film Heartburn, along with "Itsy Bitsy Spider". As a single, "Coming Around Again" became a worldwide hit; it peaked at No. 18 on the US Billboard Hot 100 (becoming Simon's 12th Top 40 hit), No. 5 on the Billboard Adult Contemporary chart, and No. 10 in the UK. The album itself reached No. 25 in both the US and the UK. It was certified Silver by the British Phonographic Industry (BPI) in September 1987, and Platinum by the Recording Industry Association of America (RIAA) in February 1988. The album spawned three more Top 10 Adult Contemporary hit singles; "Give Me All Night", "The Stuff That Dreams Are Made Of", and "All I Want Is You" (which features Roberta Flack on backing vocals), and features a cover of "As Time Goes By" with Stevie Wonder on harmonica.

In June 1987, a live outdoor concert was recorded on a specially built stage in the town of Gay Head. In front of an invited audience, Simon and her band performed eight songs from the album, as well as some of her greatest hits. It was broadcast on HBO as Carly Simon – Coming Around Again, and later released on home video as Live From Martha's Vineyard. It was also released as a live album in 1988 titled Greatest Hits Live.

On October 27, 2017, Hot Shot Records released a 30th Anniversary deluxe edition of the album. The two-disc set includes six bonus tracks, including a 12" extended remix of the single "Give Me All Night" and the Oscar winning "Let the River Run", along with a second disc consisting of Simon's aforementioned Greatest Hits Live album. An in-depth interview with Simon is also included in the albums booklet.

Reception

Writing for Rolling Stone, Rob Hoerburger gave a positive review of the album; "The title cut on Coming Around Again gives Simon the chance to step away and deliver a cozy, soothing, even hopeful song. The song sets the mood for the entire album. Many of the tracks progress with the same slow, tuneful strides and reflect Carly's new lyrical stance — that of an older sister or mother. In most cases, this would mean instant death with younger listeners, but Carly pulls it off, because her voice stays cool and confident. Maybe all those years of avoiding the road have paid off for her; while the other acoustic heroines of the 1970s — Carole King, Judy Collins, Joni Mitchell — have frayed at the edges, Carly's voice still sounds like it's in one piece. That's why it's not such a silly idea for her to cover a song like "As Time Goes By," which, if she doesn't redefine, she at least renews with some zephyrous overtones," concluding "Coming Around Again is a strong reminder of how refreshing a diversion Carly Simon can be".

Writing for The New York Times, Stephen Holden stated; "Coming Around Again, the latest and one of the strongest chapters in a growing catalogue, embodies everything that the 41-year-old singer-songwriter does best. Of all the confessional singer-songwriters who emerged out of the 60's counterculture to confide their personal feelings in recorded pop song cycles, she has been one of only a handful to sustain a major label recording career of such duration. And of that handful, she has stayed the closest to the personal confessional mode." He also singled out the track "Two Hot Girls (On a Hot Summer Night)"; "along with the title tune, the album's most haunting cut is a song of adolescent memory titled "Two Hot Girls" in which the singer remembers competing with a friend for the attentions of a boy and losing. Like "Coming Around Again", "Two Hot Girls" is quintessential Carly Simon. Blunt, succinct and catchy on the surface, underneath it is psychologically complex. 

People was also positive, writing "Simon remains perhaps the most interesting of women pop singers. This album proves she is still captivating."

Awards

Track listing
Credits adapted from the album's liner notes.

Personnel

Musicians 

 Carly Simon – lead vocals, backing vocals (1, 2, 4, 7, 10), keyboards (1, 11), arrangements (3, 11), acoustic piano (4), Yamaha DX7 (6)
 Scott Martin – keyboards (1), backing vocals (1)
 Bill Payne – keyboards (1, 11)
 Peter-John Vettese – keyboards (2, 7), backing vocals (4)
 Rob Mounsey – MIDI piano (3), programming (3), drum programming (3), string arrangements and conductor (3, 6, 9), acoustic piano (6), keyboard bass (6)
 Dave Pickell – keyboards (5)
 Robbie Kilgore – keyboards (8, 9), keyboard programming (8), synth bass (9)
 Chuck Kentis – additional keyboards (8), string synthesizer (8)
 Andy Goldmark – keyboards (9), drum machine (9)
 Leon Pendarvis – synthesizers (10), arrangements (10)
 Barbara Markay – synthesizer programming (10)
 Hugh McCracken – guitars (2, 7), tiple (8)
 Jimmy Ryan – guitars (3, 6, 8), backing vocals (4, 7, 8)
 Keith Scott – guitars (5)
 John McCurry – acoustic guitar (9)
 Tom "T-Bone" Wolk – guitars (10)
 Tony Levin – bass guitar (2, 7)
 Dave Taylor – bass guitar (5)
 Neil Jason – bass guitar (8)
 Russ Kunkel – drums (1–4, 6, 10, 11), drum machine (6)
 Frank Filipetti – LinnDrum (2, 7), drum machine programming (8)
 Mickey Curry – drums (5)
 Jimmy Bralower – percussion (2, 4), drum machine programming (8)
 Jimmy Maelen – percussion (9)
 Stevie Wonder – harmonica (3)
 Michael Brecker – EWI (4), saxophone (7)
 David Nadien – concertmaster (3, 6, 9)
 Terri Homberg – backing vocals (1)
 Paul Samwell-Smith – backing vocals (1, 4, 8), E-mu Emulator (4), LinnDrum (4)
 Lucy Simon – backing vocals (4, 7)
 Marc LaFrance – backing vocals (5)
 Timothy Wright Concert Choir – choir (6)
 Caz Lee – backing vocals (8)
 Will Lee – backing vocals (8)
 Roberta Flack – backing vocals (9)
 Gordon Grody – backing vocals (10)
 Lani Groves – backing vocals (10)
 Janice Pendarvis – backing vocals (10)
 Alexandra Taylor – backing vocals (11)
 Ben Taylor – backing vocals (11)
 Isaac Taylor – backing vocals (11)
 Sally Taylor – backing vocals (11)

Strings (3, 6, 9)
 Warren Lash, Beverly Lauridsen, Richard Locker, Carol McCracken and Charles McCracken – cello
 Lamar Alsop, Julien Barber, Theodore Israel, Carol Landon and Sue Pray – viola 
 Marin Alsop, Lewis Eley, Barry Finclair, Regis Iandiorio, Harry Lookofsky, Jan Mullen, John Pintavalle, Matthew Raimondi, Richard Sortomme, Marti Sweet and Gerald Tarack – violin

Production 

 Producers – Russ Kunkel (Tracks 1, 6 & 11); George Massenburg (Tracks 1 & 11); Bill Payne (Tracks 1 & 11); Paul Samwell-Smith (Tracks 1, 2, 4, 7 & 8); Rob Mounsey (Track 3); Bryan Adams (Track 5); John Boylan (Tracks 6 & 9); Richard Perry (Track 10).
 Associate Producers on Tracks 1–5 & 7–11 – Carly Simon and Frank Filipetti
 Executive Producer – Clive Davis 
 Production Coordinator – Gina Silvester
 Engineers – George Massenburg (Tracks 1 & 11); Frank Filipetti (Tracks 1–4 & 6–10); Richard Alderson (Track 3); Bryan Adams (Track 5); Tim Crich (Track 5); Neil Dorfsman (Track 5); Chris Lord-Alge (Tracks 8 & 9); Ed Stasium (Track 8); Bill Miranda (Track 9); Leon Pendarvis (Track 10).
 Assistant Engineers – Scott Mabuchi (all tracks); Bill Miranda (Tracks 1, 2, 4, 7 & 11); Noah Baron (Tracks 1 & 11); Michael Christopher (Track 5); Debra Cornish (Track 6); Jeff Lord-Alge (Track 9).
 Mixing – Frank Filipetti (Tracks 1–4, 6, 8, 10 & 11); Bob Clearmountain (Track 5); Chris Lord-Alge (Track 9).
 Mastering by Ted Jensen at Sterling Sound (New York, NY).  
 Creative Direction – Steven Shmerler
 Art Direction – Howard Fritzson
 Design – Margery Greenspan   
 Photography – Lynn Goldsmith  
 Management – Tommy Mottola

Charts

Weekly charts

Year-end charts

Certifications

References

External links
Carly Simon's Official Website
 "Coming Around Again" video on YouTube.

1987 albums
Arista Records albums
Carly Simon albums
Albums produced by Richard Perry
Albums produced by Clive Davis
Albums produced by John Boylan (record producer)
Albums produced by Frank Filipetti
Albums produced by George Massenburg
Albums produced by Paul Samwell-Smith
Albums produced by Russ Kunkel
Albums recorded at MSR Studios